Coleophora jebeli is a moth of the family Coleophoridae. It is found in Saudi Arabia.

References

jebeli
Moths described in 1985
Moths of Asia